Rideout is a surname. Notable people with the surname include:

Alice Rideout (born 1874), American sculptor
Bonnie Rideout (born 1962), American fiddler
George Rideout (born 1945), Canadian politician
Henry Milner Rideout (1877–1927), American author 
Janet Rideout (born 1939), American chemist
Jordan Rideout (born 1993), English footballer
Kyle Rideout (born 1984), Canadian actor
Leon B. Rideout (1920–1987), Canadian politician
Margaret Rideout (1923–2010), Canadian politician
Nancie Rideout (1938–1996), American water skier
Paul Rideout (born 1964), English footballer
Sherwood Rideout (1917–1964), Canadian politician
Tanis Rideout, Canadian writer
Tom Rideout (born 1948), Canadian politician

See also 
 Ridout